Hyalobathra aequalis is a moth in the family Crambidae. It was described by Julius Lederer in 1863. It is found in south-east Asia.

References

Moths described in 1863
Pyraustinae